The World Championship of Golf was a championship played on the PGA Tour in the 1940s and 1950s that, in its latter years, boasted a purse that dwarfed every other event on the tour, including even the U.S. Open. It was played in August of each year at the Tam O'Shanter Country Club, in Niles, Illinois. The same course was the venue for the All American Open played the preceding week; both tournaments were instigated by course owner George S. May. In 1953, the championship was the first golf tournament to be shown live on national television, and happily for the promoters, ended in incredible fashion, with Lew Worsham holing a wedge shot from the fairway for eagle and victory.

History
From 1946 to 1948, the event was a 36-hole, winner-take-all exhibition event, with fields of four, eight, and twelve golfers, respectively. The winner took home prizes of $10,000, $5,000, and $10,000, respectively, and the losers were given generous travel expenses.

Beginning in 1949, however, the event grew to a full-fledged 72-hole championship with a large invited field, became part of the main tour, and with its huge prize fund, became undoubtedly one of the most important tournaments for the professionals. From 1949 to 1951, its winner would go home with a check for over $10,000 – this in the days when most tour events had a first prize of $2,000 – but it was from 1952 to 1957 that the purse grew to astronomical levels. The winner took home $25,000 in 1952 and 1953, and starting in 1954, $50,000 with an additional $50,000 available in the form of a contract with May for 50 worldwide exhibition events.

In each of those years (1952–57), the winner of the Championship topped the tour's money list by some distance – in 1954, for example, Bob Toski led the season's money earnings with $64,000, while Jack Burke Jr. was second with just $20,000. Without the $50,000 from his one victory at Tam O'Shanter, he would have finished just tenth in earnings, despite winning three other tournaments. In 1957, Dick Mayer won both the U.S. Open – and a check for $7,200 – and this championship, and a check for $50,000. 

The event provided one of the few showcases of its time for leading international players to compete against the best U.S. professionals, who rarely travelled outside of their country to play. Although none would win the title, players like Bobby Locke, Norman Von Nida, Roberto De Vicenzo, and Peter Thomson would all enjoy high finishes in the tournament, De Vicenzo and Thomson in particular regularly collecting big checks.  

In 1958, May decided to pull the plug on the event in a dispute with the PGA over player entrance fees, and it disappeared from the tour. The leading money winner for 1958, Arnold Palmer, won less money during the entire season than Dick Mayer had won at Tam O'Shanter in 1957.

Winners

References

Former PGA Tour events
Golf in Chicago
Niles, Illinois
Recurring sporting events established in 1946
Recurring events disestablished in 1957
1946 establishments in Illinois
1957 disestablishments in Illinois
World championships in golf